The Lives of Thérèse is a French documentary film, released in 2016. Directed by Sébastien Lifshitz, the film is a profile of French feminist and LGBT activist Thérèse Clerc as she battles terminal illness. Clerc died several weeks before the film's theatrical premiere.

The film won the Queer Palm for best LGBT-related film at the 2016 Cannes Film Festival.

References

External links 
 

2016 films
French documentary films
French LGBT-related films
2016 LGBT-related films
Films directed by Sébastien Lifshitz
Documentary films about lesbians
Queer Palm winners
2010s French films